Świat według Kiepskich is a Polish-language studio album by the punk rock band Big Cyc. It was released on 11 June 2000, by the EMI Music Poland record label. Its titular song was commissioned as the theme song of the sitcom Świat według Kiepskich. The album was recorded in 1999, in the studio Hendrix in Lublin, Poland. In 2001, the album was awarded the diamond certification by the Polish Society of the Phonographic Industry, for selling 50 000 copies. Songs of the album are separated by the monologues of Andrzej Grabowski in the role of the main character of the television series, Ferdynand Kiepski.

Track listing
Ferdynand Kiepski ujawnia całą prawdę o zespole Big Cyc* (F. Kiepski discloses all truth about Big Cyc)
"Świat według Kiepskich" (The world according to Kiepscy)
"Czas na rwanie" (Time to score) – cover of Die Toten Hosen
"Kumple Janosika" (Janosik's pals)
Bardzo ważne przesłanie Ferdusia Kiepskiego do kierowców* (F. Kiepski's  very important message to the drivers)
"Mały Fiat" (Small Fiat)
Bełkot Ferdynanda* (Ferdynand's mumbling)
"Kocham piwo" (I love beer)
"Śmieci" (Scum)
Ferdynand Kiepski coś krzyczy* (Ferdynand Kiepski shouts something)
"Bułgarka" (Bulgarian girl) – a version of a children's song Stokrotka
Kolejny bezsensowny monolog Ferdynanda Kiepskiego* (Another nonsense monologue of F. Kiepski)
"Nasza rodzinka" (Our family) – cover of Tito Puente's El Mundo
"Zawsze płyń pod prąd" (Always go against the stream)
Ferdynand Kiepski głupieje od tego wszystkiego* (F. Kiepski goes nuts of it all)
"Niech każdy robi to co chce" (Let everyone do what they please) – cover of Locomotiv GT
"Wyróżnienie" (Distinction)
"Hipermarket"
Kiepski ujawnia informację, która może uratować świat (Kiepski discloses an information which may save the world)
"Idą święta" (Christmas is coming)
Ferdynand Kiepski współczuje* (Ferdynand Kiepski is sorry)

The asterisk marks Kiepski's monologues.

Credits
Dżej Dżej – bass guitar, lead vocals
Dżery – drums, vocals
Piękny Roman – lead guitar, vocals
Skiba – vocals, lyrics

Guest starring:
Andrzej Grabowski as Ferdynand Kiepski
Magda Femme – vocals on Czas na rwanie
Jacek Dewódzki – vocals on Kocham piwo

Notes

References 

2000 albums
Big Cyc albums